The 12067 / 12068 Guwahati - Jorhat Town Jan Shatabdi Express is a Superfast Express train of the Jan Shatabdi Express series   belonging to Indian Railways - Northeast Frontier Railway zone that runs between Guwahati and Jorhat Town in India.

It operates as train number 12067 from Guwahati to Jorhat Town and as train number 12068 in the reverse direction, serving the states of Assam and Nagaland.

It is part of the Jan Shatabdi Express series launched by the former railway minister of India, Mr. Nitish Kumar in the 2002 / 03 Rail Budget  .

Coaches

The 12067 /68 Guwahati–Jorhat Town Jan Shatabdi Express has 3 AC Chair Car (LWSCZAC), 10 Second Class seating (LWSCZ) & 2 Generator cum luggage cum Guard Coaches (LWLRRM). It does not carry a Pantry car coach   .

As is customary with most train services in India, Coach Composition may be amended at the discretion of Indian Railways depending on demand.

Service

As the average speed of the train is above , as per Indian Railways rules, its fare includes a Superfast Express surcharge.

Route & Halts

The 12067/68 Guwahati–Jorhat Town Jan Shatabdi Express runs from  via , 

Traction

As the entire route is yet to be fully electrified, a Guwahati based WDM-3D or WDP-4D or a Siliguri based WDP-4, WDP-4B or WDP-4D locomotive is the traditional power for this train and hauls the train for its entire journey.

Operation

12067 Guwahati–Jorhat Town Jan Shatabdi Express runs from Guwahati on all days except Sunday arriving Jorhat Town the same day .

12068 Jorhat Town–Guwahati Jan Shatabdi Express runs from Jorhat Town on all days except Sunday arriving Guwahati the same day .

Incidents

On 10 November 2008, the train narrowly averted de-railment.

References 

 http://pib.nic.in/archive/railbudget/railbgt2002-03/railbgtsp1.html
 http://www.indianrail.gov.in/jan_shatabdi.html
 http://pib.nic.in/archieve/lreleng/lyr2002/rapr2002/12042002/r120420021.html
 https://www.youtube.com/watch?v=VXnCvyCnVvA
 http://www.holidayiq.com/railways/guwahati-jorhat-jan-shatabdi-12067-train.html
 http://irfca.org/apps/locolinks/show/211
 https://www.flickr.com/photos/abhinavnfr/6210750492/
 
 http://www.90di.com/schedule/train/Indian%20Railways_12068.html

External links

Rail transport in Assam
Jan Shatabdi Express trains
Transport in Guwahati
Transport in Jorhat